Charlie Sanford Brill (born January 13, 1938) is an American actor, voice artist, and comedian.

Acting
Brill's first motion picture was The Beast of Budapest. He appeared in Blackbeard's Ghost and The Amazing Dobermans. He played Klingon spy Arne Darvin in the Star Trek episode "The Trouble with Tribbles" (1967) and reprised the role nearly 30 years later in the Star Trek: Deep Space Nine episode "Trials and Tribble-ations" (1996). He and his wife Mitzi McCall played Capt. Harry Lipschitz and Mrs. Lipschitz on the long-running series Silk Stalkings.

Brill and McCall performed sketch comedy on The Ed Sullivan Show on the same episode as The Beatles' first appearance on February 9, 1964. They were interviewed in 2005 for the "Big Break" episode of PRI radio program This American Life regarding their Beatles-Sullivan experience, including a dressing room encounter with John Lennon.

In 1968–1969, Brill and McCall appeared on Rowan and Martin's Laugh-In, but only as the violently bickering couple in "The Fun Couple" sketches.  Brill was a frequent panelist on the 1970s revival of Match Game and, along with McCall, the celebrity-couples game show Tattletales.

Voice acting

Brill has been working as a voice actor in animation. On television, he supplied the voice of the main character Grimmy in the animated series of Mother Goose and Grimm (which starred Mitzi McCall as Mother Goose) and in several movies, including voices in the two Flintstones features Hollyrock-a-Bye Baby and I Yabba-Dabba Do!.

He voiced King Poppin' Lockin' and a tired artist in an episode of the hit Cartoon Network series Grim & Evil. He has voiced several other characters in three other shows by Hanna-Barbera, including Tom & Jerry Kids; Droopy, Master Detective; and Yo Yogi!.

References

External links
 

1938 births
American male film actors
American male television actors
American male voice actors
People from Brooklyn
Living people